The Quinn Ranger Station, also known as the Quinn Patrol Cabin and Quinn's Horse Camp, is the only surviving ranger station from the time when Sequoia National Park was administered by the U.S. Army.

Sequoia was the second National Park to be established after Yellowstone National Park, and predated the establishment of the National Park Service. The one-room log cabin was built in 1907, in early National Park Service Rustic style.

References

Park buildings and structures on the National Register of Historic Places in California
National Register of Historic Places in Sequoia National Park
National Park Service rustic in Sequoia National Park
History of the San Joaquin Valley
Government buildings completed in 1907
National Park Service ranger stations
Military facilities on the National Register of Historic Places in California
1907 establishments in California